Alexander Torvund (born 1 August 2000) is a professional footballer who plays as a winger for Hungarian club Csákvár, on loan from Mezőkövesdi. Born in Norway, he has represented Hungary internationally at youth levels.

References

Living people
2000 births
Sportspeople from Bærum
Hungarian people of Norwegian descent
Hungarian footballers
Association football wingers
Hungary youth international footballers
Fehérvár FC players
Ullern IF players
Stabæk Fotball players
Mezőkövesdi SE footballers
Szentlőrinci SE footballers
Csákvári TK players
Nemzeti Bajnokság I players
Nemzeti Bajnokság II players
Hungarian expatriate footballers
Hungarian expatriate sportspeople in Norway
Expatriate footballers in Norway